The Minister of State for Home Affairs is a mid-level position in the Home Office in the British government. The office has been vacant since 30 October 2022.

Responsibilities
The current Minister has following responsibilities:

migration and borders ‘shadow’ in the Lords
migration and borders legislation
customer services (UKVI, HMPO, GRO and Windrush Compensation Scheme) operations
cross-cutting legal issues and oversight of HOLA
EU Settlement Scheme
Common Travel Area
NI Protocol

List of Ministers

References

Home Office (United Kingdom)
Government ministers